Árpád Tóth (14 April 1886 – 7 November 1928) was a Hungarian poet and translator.

Tóth went to secondary school (gymnasium) in Debrecen and then studied German and Hungarian at the University of Budapest. In 1907, his poems began to appear in the papers A Hét and Vasárnapi Újság and after 1908 in Nyugat. In 1911, he became a theater critic for the paper Debreceni Nagy Újság.

In 1913, he became a tutor to a wealthy family and received a little income from writing but still lived in poverty. Tuberculosis led him to rest at the Svedlér Sanitorium in the Tatra Mountains.

During the period of the revolutionary government after World War I, he became secretary of the Vörösmarty Academy, but lost the position and couldn't find new work after the government's fall. He remained poor and sick with tuberculosis for the rest of his life, succumbing to the disease in Budapest in 1928. His prolonged suffering led him to consider suicide at one point – although he did join the staff of Az Est in 1921.

In Debrecen, a secondary school was named after him. In April 2011, the Hungarian National Bank issued a commemorative silver coin celebrating the 125th anniversary of the poet's birth.

Works
He was a major lyric poet and contributed to the Nyugat School. His core themes focused on fleeting happiness and resignation.

He translated Milton, Oscar Wilde, Shelley, Keats, Baudelaire, Flaubert, Gautier, Maupassant, and Chekhov.

References

1886 births
1928 deaths
People from Arad, Romania
Hungarian male poets
Translators to Hungarian
20th-century deaths from tuberculosis
20th-century Hungarian poets
20th-century translators
20th-century Hungarian male writers
Tuberculosis deaths in Hungary